Sophronica exocentroides is a species of beetle in the family Cerambycidae. It was described by Stephan von Breuning and Téocchi in 1973.

References

Sophronica
Beetles described in 1973